Oliver Andrew Morse (March 26, 1815 – April 20, 1870) was a U.S. Representative from New York.

Born in Cherry Valley, New York, Morse pursued classical studies and was graduated from Hamilton College, Clinton, New York, in 1833, where he was a founding member of the Alpha Delta Phi Literary Society.
He studied law.
He was admitted to the bar and commenced practice in Cherry Valley, New York.

Morse was elected as a Republican to the Thirty-fifth Congress (March 4, 1857 – March 3, 1859).
He was not a candidate for renomination in 1858.
Writer and translator.
He died in New York City on April 20, 1870.
He was interred in Cherry Valley Cemetery, Cherry Valley, New York.

External links

Sources

1815 births
1870 deaths
Hamilton College (New York) alumni
Alpha Delta Phi founders
Republican Party members of the United States House of Representatives from New York (state)
19th-century American politicians